The Varanasi - Gonda Intercity Express is an Express train belonging to Northern Railway zone that runs between Gonda Junction and Varanasi Junction in India. It is currently being operated with 14213/14214 train numbers on a daily basis.

Service

The 14213/Varanasi - Gonda Intercity Express has an average speed of 42 km/hr and covers 255 km in 6h. 14214/Gonda - Varanasi Intercity Express has an average speed of 38 km/hr and covers 255 km in 6h 45m.

Route and halts 

The important halts of the train are:

Coach composite

The train has standard ICF rakes with max speed of 110 kmph. The train consists of 10 coaches:

 1 Chair Car
 7 General
 2 SLR

Traction

Both trains are hauled by a Lucknow Loco Shed based WDM3D diesel locomotive from Gonda to Varanasi and vice versa.

Direction Reversal

Train Reverses its direction 2 times:

See also 

 Varanasi Junction railway station
 Gonda Junction railway station
 Krishak Express

Notes

External links 

 14213/Varanasi - Gonda Intercity Express
 14214/Gonda - Varanasi Intercity Express

References 

Passenger trains originating from Varanasi
Transport in Gonda, Uttar Pradesh
Intercity Express (Indian Railways) trains
Railway services introduced in 2011